Bulaotun Town is a town located in the Miyun District of Beijing, China. It lies between part of Yan Mountain Range and Miyun Reservoir. The town borders Mayingzi Manchu Ethnic Township to the north, Gaoling Town to the east, Xiwengzhuang and Mujiayu Towns to the south, as well as Shicheng and Fengjiayu Towns to the west. In 2020, it was home to 12,705 inhabitants.

This town's name Bulaotun originates from a local legend about a farmer encountering two immortals during his woodcutting trip in the mountains.

History

Administrative divisions 
In the year 2021, Bulaotun Town consisted of 28 subdivisions, with 2 communities and 26 villages. They are listed as follows:

Transportation 
Liuxin Road runs through the town.

See also 
 List of township-level divisions of Beijing

References

Miyun District
Towns in Beijing